Eshgaftak (also known as Eshkaftak) is a village in Howmeh Rural District, in the Central District of Shahrekord County, Chaharmahal and Bakhtiari Province, Iran. At the 2006 census, its population was 3,891, in 1,014 families.

References 

Populated places in Shahr-e Kord County